Spencer Cemetery is a historic cemetery located at Cameron, Marshall County, West Virginia. The cemetery includes just one grave monument and two related headstones for John W. "Jack" Spencer (1841–1914) and his third wife, Eva "Effie" (Winters) Spencer (1866–1919). The eight foot-tall carved limestone marker is in the shape of two tree trunks with entwined branches.  It includes an engraved badge of the Grand Army of the Republic (GAR).

It was listed on the National Register of Historic Places in 2012.

References

External links
 

Cemeteries on the National Register of Historic Places in West Virginia
Buildings and structures in Marshall County, West Virginia
National Register of Historic Places in Marshall County, West Virginia